Pribanjci  is a village in Croatia on the border with Slovenia. It is connected by the D204 highway.

Populated places in Karlovac County